The Indecent Publications Act was an Act of Parliament passed in New Zealand in 1910 replacing earlier censorship legislation. The purpose was to "censor smut while protecting worthwhile material".

It was repealed by the Indecent Publications Act 1963.

See also
Censorship in New Zealand

References

External links
Text of the Act
History of censorship at the Office of Film and Literature Classification

Statutes of New Zealand
Censorship in New Zealand
1910 in New Zealand law
Obscenity law